Wiktor Sawicki is a retired Polish runner who specialized in the marathon.

He finished twelfth in the marathon at the 1986 European Championships. He became Polish champion in the 20 kilometres race in 1986 and in the marathon in 1988.

References

Year of birth missing (living people)
Living people
Polish male long-distance runners
Place of birth missing (living people)
Polish male marathon runners